Chiradzulu is a district in the Southern Region of Malawi. The capital is Chiradzulu. The district covers an area of 767 km.² and has a population of 236,050.

Demographics
At the time of the 2018 Census of Malawi, the distribution of the population of Chiradzulu District by ethnic group was as follows:
 69.3% Lomwe
 18.6% Yao
 4.2% Ngoni
 3.2% Chewa
 1.9% Nyanja
 1.7% Mang'anja
 0.4% Sena
 0.3% Tumbuka
 0.1% Tonga
 0.0% Nkhonde
 0.0% Lambya
 0.0% Sukwa
 0.2% Others

Government and administrative divisions

There are five National Assembly constituencies in Chiradzulu:

 Chiradzulu - Central
 Chiradzulu - East
 Chiradzulu - North
 Chiradzulu - South
 Chiradzulo - West

Since the 2009 general election all of these constituencies have been represented by politicians from the Democratic Progressive Party.

See also
Masanjala

References

Districts of Malawi
Districts in Southern Region, Malawi